The Department of Defence was an Australian government department that existed between December 1921 and November 1939.

History
The department was formed in December 1921 when then Navy Office was merged into the existing Department of Defence.

Scope
Information about the department's functions and/or government funding allocation could be found in the Administrative Arrangements Orders, the annual budget statements and in the department's annual reports.

When it was established, the department was responsible for Naval, Army and Air Defence matters,
and ran a number of factories for munitions, small arms, cordite and clothing etc.

Structure
The department was a Commonwealth Public Service department, staffed by officials who were responsible to the Minister for Defence.

The Secretaries of the Department were Thomas Trumble (1921‑1927), Malcolm Shepherd (1927‑1937), and finally Frederick Shedden (1937‑1939).

References

Ministries established in 1921
Defence
1921 establishments in Australia
1939 disestablishments in Australia